A. G. Mohan (born 1945) is an Indian yoga teacher, author, and co-founder of Svastha Yoga & Ayurveda. Mohan was a longtime disciple of Tirumalai Krishnamacharya (1888-1989), the "father of modern yoga". 

Mohan co-founded with T.K.V. Desikachar the Krishnamacharya Yoga Mandiram in Chennai, India, and was its Honorary Secretary from its inception, in 1976, to 1989. Mohan was the convener of Krishnamacharya's centenary celebrations.

Indra Mohan, married to A. G. Mohan and co-founder of Svastha Yoga & Ayurveda, is one of the few people who received a post-graduate diploma in yoga from Krishnamacharya.

In the foreword to Yoga for Body, Breath, and Mind, Krishnamacharya stated that his sons had deservedly reached the status of "sathirthyas", people who had studied under a guru. He added that Mohan had studied the Yoga Sutras of Patanjali and was competent to teach asana and pranayama. He noted that Mohan had further studied Samkhya philosophy, while in Ayurveda he has studied diagnosis, treatment, causes of disease, and the body's constitution.

Svastha Yoga & Ayurveda 
The Mohans offer their teachings in India and internationally under the banner of Svastha Yoga & Ayurveda.  The word svastha in Sanskrit literally means "to stay in one’s own abode" and refers to the state of complete health and balance.   Svastha Yoga & Ayurveda advocates an integrated approach using yoga and ayurveda to achieve the state of svastha.

Works 
Mohan, A. G. with Ganesh Mohan.  Krishnamacharya: His Life and Teachings.  Shambhala Publications, 2010.  .
Mohan, A. G., and Indra Mohan. Yoga Therapy:  A Guide to the Therapeutic Use of Yoga and Ayurveda for Health and Fitness.  Shambhala Publications, 2004.  .
Mohan, A. G. with foreword by Sri Tirumalai Krishnamacharya.   Yoga for Body, Breath, and Mind:  A Guide to Personal Reintegration.  Shambhala Publications, 2002.  .
Mohan, A. G. with Ganesh Mohan.   Yoga Reminder: Lightened Reflections.  Svastha Yoga, 2015.  .
Mohan, A. G., translator. Yoga-Yajnavalkya.  Ganesh & Co., 2000.  .
Mohan, A. G., translator with Ganesh Mohan. Yoga Yajnavalkya (2nd ed.).  Svastha Yoga, 2013.  .

See also 
 Krishnamacharya

References

External links

Profile at Svastha Yoga & Ayurveda web site
A. G. Mohan on Facebook

1945 births
Living people
Indian yoga gurus
Modern yoga pioneers